au, or au by KDDI, is a Japanese mobile phone operator. au is a brand marketed by KDDI in the main islands of Japan and by Okinawa Cellular in Okinawa for their mobile cellular services. au is the second-largest wireless carrier in Japan, with 60.398 million subscribers as of March 2021.

Naming
According to the brand creator, the name 'au' is based on the Japanese verbs for 'meet' (会う) and 'unite' (合う) (both pronounced 'au'). However, KDDI explains that au comes from two letters which stand for few words. 'A' is for access, always and amenity, and 'U' is for unique, universal and user. There is also a phrase, 'access to u(you)' that goes along the brand name.

History
The network that would eventually become Au was originally set up as two networks: DDI and IDO. IDO's network was based upon the NTT Hi-cap analog cellular system, and began operations in December 1988 in the Kanto and Tokai regions. DDI's network was run by independent phone companies, and began service in 1989 using the TACS system elsewhere in Japan. Nippon Idou Tsushin (IDO) was owned by Toyota, whereas DDI was owned by Kyocera Corporation.

 was established in November 2000 by Kyocera as part of the DDI Cellular network. In 2001, the company was merged into KDDI (which had been formed in 2000 by the merger of DDI, KDD, and IDO), but its brand name was retained and applied to all mobile phone service under KDDI group.

Au established a nationwide 3G network in 2003, replacing its previous cdmaOne service with CDMA 1X WIN (1xEV-DO Rev A) service.

Au started selling the iPhone 4S from 14 October 2011.

Au launched LTE service as 'Au 4G LTE' in September 2012.

Au launched 5G service as 'UNLIMITED WORLD au 5G' in 26, March 2020.

Products and services
EZweb: A service which provides various features for mobile phone users, including e-mail, web browsing, picture and video sharing, video conferencing, access to location-based services, games and Emoji. The service runs on traditional cdmaOne mobile phone networks at a data rate of 64 kbit/s or on the new 1xEV-DO Rev A network with up to 3.1 Mbit/s downstream and 1.8 Mbit/s upstream bandwidth. In spring 2004, au became the first cellular phone based data service provider to offer an unlimited use flat-rate plan in Japan.
EZweb@mail: Multimedia messaging service.
C-mail: Short Message Service
EZchakuuta: A service which allows users to use song segments, usually 30 seconds or less, as ring tones. Chakuuta's rights are held by Sony Music Entertainment Japan.
Chaku Uta Full: A service distributing full length songs over the mobile network. The selection offered is mainly pop music. The coding format is 48 kbit/s HE-AAC. The size of one piece of music is about 1.5 MiB. Downloaded content is secured on a memory card (miniSD, microSD, Memory Stick PRO Duo, M2) plugged into the mobile, using CPRM copy protection. Chaku-Uta Full is the trademark of Sony Music Entertainment Japan.
EZappli: BREW applications.
EZmovie: Movie player.
EZchannel
EZ Machi Uta: A service that allows users to customize their ringback tones with music, etc.
EZnavigation: A service which is a component of EZWeb and allows GPS-enabled handsets to plot their position. 
EZnaviwalk: Gives scrolling map and audio navigation to guide you to your destination. Also displays restaurant, shop and weather information for the area.
EZnewsflash: Using BCMCS technology.
PC Site Viewer
LISMO: au Listen Mobile Service. (Character mascot for this service is LISMO-kun).
Global Passport: Global roaming service (CDMA and GSM), the first AU handset requiring a "SIM card" (IC Card).
Global Expert: Successor to above
EZ FeliCa: Osaifu-Keitai, a payment system.
EZ television: An EZappli when watching analog terrestrial broadcasting. Ended on 24 July 2011 in most areas and on 31 March 2012 in Iwate, Miyagi, and Fukushima prefectures.
EZ television 1seg: Supports 1seg digital terrestrial broadcasting for phones and mobile devices. Also supports data broadcasts. EZ television 1seg does not support analog television.
au 4G LTE: FDD-LTE service.
AU internet: an internet service provided by AU through KDDI from Japan.

References

External links
 

KDDI
Mobile phone companies of Japan
Telecommunications companies of Japan
Japanese companies established in 2000
Japanese brands
Telecommunications companies established in 2000
Retail companies established in 2000